Kamala Surayya  (born Kamala; 31 March 1934 – 31 May 2009), popularly known by her one-time pen name Madhavikutty and married name Kamala Das, was an Indian poet in English as well as an author in Malayalam from Kerala, India. Her popularity in Kerala is based chiefly on her short stories and autobiography, while her oeuvre in English, written under the name Kamala Das, is noted for the poems and explicit autobiography. She was also a widely read columnist and wrote on diverse topics including women's issues, child care, politics, etc. Her liberal treatment of female sexuality, marked her as an iconoclast in popular culture of her generation. On 31 May 2009, aged 75, she died at Jehangir Hospital in Pune.

Early life and childhood
Kamala Das was born in Punnayurkulam, Ponnani taluk, Malabar District, British India (present-day Thrissur district, Kerala, India) on 31 March 1934, to V. M. Nair, a managing editor of the widely circulated Malayalam daily Mathrubhumi, and Nalapat Balamani Amma, a renowned Malayali poet.

She spent her childhood between Calcutta, where her father was employed as a senior officer in the Walford Transport Company that sold Bentley and Rolls-Royce automobiles, and the Nalapat ancestral home in Punnayurkulam.

Like her mother Balamani Amma, Kamala Das also excelled in writing. Her love of poetry began at an early age through the influence of her great uncle, Nalapat Narayana Menon, a prominent writer.

At the age of 15, she married bank officer Madhav Das, who encouraged her writing interests, and she started writing and publishing both in English and in Malayalam. Calcutta in the 1960s was a tumultuous time for the arts, and Kamala Das was one of the many voices that came up and started appearing in cult anthologies along with a generation of Indian English poets. English was the language she chose for all six of her published poetry collections.

Literary career
She was noted for her several Malayalam short stories as well as poems written in English. Kamala Das was also a syndicated columnist. She once claimed that "poetry does not sell in this country [India]", but her forthright columns, which sounded off on everything from women's issues and child care to politics, were popular. Kamala Das was a confessional poet whose poems have often been considered at par with those of Anne Sexton and Robert Lowell.

Kamala Das' first book of poetry, Summer in Calcutta was a breath of fresh air in Indian English poetry. She wrote chiefly of love, betrayal, and the consequent anguish. Das abandoned the certainties offered by an archaic, and somewhat sterile, aestheticism for an independence of mind and body at a time when Indian poets were still governed by "19th-century diction, sentiment and romanticised love."

Her second book of poetry, The Descendants was even more explicit, urging women to:

This directness of her voice led to comparisons with Marguerite Duras and Sylvia Plath. At the age of 42, she published a daring autobiography, My Story; it was originally written in Malayalam (titled Ente Katha) and later she translated it into English. Later she admitted that much of the autobiography had fictional elements.

"An Introduction" is very bold poem in which Das expresses her femininity, individuality, and true feelings about men. This autobiographical poem is written in the colloquial style. She presents her feelings and thoughts in a bold manner. She realises her identity and understands that it is the need of every woman to raise a voice in this male-dominated society. The poet longs for love that is the result of her loneliness and frustration. 
              
The poem "A Hot Noon in Malabar" is about climate, surrounding in a town in Malabar. The people may be annoyed by the heat, dust and noise but she likes it. She longs for the hot noon in Malabar because she associates it with the wild men, wild thoughts and wild love. It is a torture for her to be away from Malabar.

In "My Mother at Sixty-Six," Das explores the irony in mother-daughter relationship, and includes the themes of aging, growing-up, separation and love. "Dance of Eunuchs" is another fine poem in which Das sympathises with eunuchs. It has an autobiographical tone. The eunuchs dance in the heat of the sun. Their costumes, makeup and their passion with which they dance suggest the female delicacy. Their outward appearance and joy is contrasted with their inward sadness. Actually, there is no joy in their heart, they cannot even dream of happiness. In the poem "A Request," Das realises that her life is meaningless. She is alone and her colourless life is designed of crumbling patterns.

Kamala Das is essentially known for her bold and frank expression. The prominent features of her poetry are an acute obsession with love and the use of confession. The main theme of her poetry is based upon freedom, love and protection. She wrote on a diverse range of topics, often disparate - from the story of a poor old servant, about the sexual disposition of upper-middle-class women living near a metropolitan city or in the middle of the ghetto. Some of her better-known stories include Pakshiyude Manam, Neypayasam, Thanuppu, and Chandana Marangal. She wrote a few novels, out of which Neermathalam Pootha Kalam, which was received favourably by the general readers, as well as, the critics, stands out.

She travelled extensively to read poetry to Germany's University of Duisburg-Essen, University of Bonn and University of Duisburg universities, Adelaide Writer's Festival, Frankfurt Book Fair, University of Kingston, Jamaica, Singapore, and South Bank Festival (London), Concordia University (Montreal, Canada), etc. Her works are available in French, Spanish, Russian, German and Japanese.

She has also held positions as Vice-chairperson in Kerala Sahitya Akademi, chairperson in Kerala Forestry Board, President of the Kerala Children's Film Society, editor of Poet magazine and poetry editor of Illustrated Weekly of India.

Although occasionally seen as an attention-grabber in her early years, she is now seen as one of the most formative influences on Indian English poetry. In 2009, The Times called her "the mother of modern English Indian poetry".

Her last book titled The Kept Woman and Other Stories, featuring translation of her short stories, was published posthumously. Kamala Das is best remembered for her controversial writings where she openly talks about the restriction imposed on women. She is known for her rebellious nature against the patriarchal conventions.

Personal life

Kamala married Madhav Das at the age of 15. The couple had three sons: M D Nalapat, Chinen Das and Jayasurya Das. Her husband who happened to be bisexual later on in their marriage life, predeceased her in 1992, after 43 years of marriage. Madhav Das Nalapat, her eldest son, is married to Princess Thiruvathira Thirunal Lakshmi Bayi (daughter of Princess Pooyam Thirunal Gouri Parvati Bayi and Sri Chembrol Raja Raja Varma Avargal) from the Travancore Royal House. He holds the UNESCO Peace Chair and is a professor of geopolitics at the Manipal University. He had been a resident editor of The Times of India. Kamala Surayya converted to Islam in 1999 and announced that she planned to marry her Muslim lover, but she never remarried.

On 31 May 2009, aged 75, she died at a hospital in Pune, after a long battle with pneumonia. Her body was flown to her home state of Kerala. She was interred at the Palayam Juma Masjid at Thiruvananthapuram with full state honour.

Politics
Though never politically active before, she launched a national political party, Lok Seva Party, aiming at the promotion of so called secularism and providing asylum to orphaned mothers. In 1984 she unsuccessfully contested in the Indian Parliament elections from Trivandrum constituency. She contested as an independent candidate and received only 1786 votes. She was depressed after the results and was advised to rest at her sister's house in Anamalai hills. She wrote the Anamalai Poems during this period. She wrote over twenty poems in this series, but only eleven have been published: eight of them in Indian Literature journal by the Sahitya Akademi (1985) and an additional three of them in the book The Best of Kamala Das (1991).

Conversion to Islam
She was born in a conservative Hindu Nair (Nalapat) family, and married to Aristrocratic Menon family (Kalipurayath) which is having royal ancestry. She converted to Islam on 11 December 1999, at the age of 65 and assumed the name Kamala Surayya.

Legacy

 On 1 February 2018, Google Doodle by artist Manjit Thapp celebrates the work she left behind, which provides a window into the world of an engrossing woman.
 A biopic on her titled Aami directed by Kamal, released on 9 February 2018.

Awards and Other Recognitions
Kamala Das has received many awards for her literary contribution, including:
 1963: PEN Asian Poetry Prize
 1968: Kerala Sahitya Akademi Award for Story – Thanuppu
 1984: Shortlisted for the Nobel Prize in Literature
 1985: Kendra Sahitya Academy Award (English) – Collected Poems
 1988: Kerala State Film Award for Best Story
 1997: Vayalar Award – Neermathalam Pootha Kalam
 1998: Asian Poetry Prize
 2006: Honorary D.Litt by University of Calicut
 2006: Muttathu Varkey Award
 2002: Ezhuthachan Award

Books

English

Malayalam

Appearances in the following poetry Anthologies 
 Ten Twentieth-Century Indian Poets (1976) ed. by R. Parthasarathy and published by Oxford University Press, New Delhi
 The Oxford India Anthology of Twelve Modern Indian Poets (1992) ed. by Arvind Krishna Mehrotra and published by Oxford University Press, New Delhi
 The Golden Treasure of Writers Workshop Poetry (2008) ed. by Rubana Huq and published by Writers Workshop, Calcutta

See also

 Indian English literature
 Indian Writer
 Indian Poets

Further reading
 The Ignited Soul by Shreekumar Varma
 Manohar, D. Murali. Kamala Das: Treatment of Love in Her Poetry.indear Kumar Gulbarga: JIWE, 1999.
 "Cheated and Exploited: Women in Kamala Das's Short Stories", In Mohan G Ramanan and P. Sailaja (eds.). English and the Indian Short Story. New Delhi: Orient Longman (2000).117–123
 "Man-Woman Relationship with Respect to the Treatment of Love in Kamala Das' Poetry".  Contemporary Literary Criticism Vol. 191. Ed. Tom Burns and Jeffrey W. Hunter. Detroit: Thomson-Gale, 2004. 44–60.
 "Individuality in Kamala Das and in Her Poetry". English Poetry in India: A Secular Viewpoint. Eds. PCK Prem and D.C.Chambial. Jaipur: Aavishkar, 2011. 65–73.
 "Meet the Writer: Kamala Das", POETCRIT XVI: 1 (January 2003): 83–98.

References

External links

 "Meet the Author: Kamala Das". Sahitya Akademi (Audio).
 "From Kamala Das to Dashi: Doing the right thing for wrong reasons?" by Dr Mohammad Omar Farooq
 Translation of Neypayasam
 Eroticism and feminism in Das' writings
 
 Varsha Bhosle on Kamala Das' conversion to Islam
 Funeral
 Kamala Suraiyya – Daily Telegraph obituary
Kamla Das

1934 births
2009 deaths
Indian women novelists
21st-century Indian Muslims
Kerala State Film Award winners
Malayalam-language writers
Malayalam novelists
Writers from Pune
People from Thrissur district
Recipients of the Sahitya Akademi Award in English
Recipients of the Ezhuthachan Award
English-language poets from India
Manipal Academy of Higher Education alumni
Converts to Islam from Hinduism
Indian women poets
20th-century Indian poets
20th-century Indian novelists
Novelists from Kerala
21st-century Indian novelists
21st-century Indian poets
20th-century Indian women writers
21st-century Indian women writers
21st-century Indian writers
Women writers from Kerala
20th-century pseudonymous writers
Pseudonymous women writers